Royton is a town in the Metropolitan Borough of Oldham, Greater Manchester, England and it is unparished.  It contains five listed buildings that are recorded in the National Heritage List for England.  Of these, one is listed at Grade II*, the middle grade, and the others are at Grade II, the lowest grade.   The area was rural until the coming of the Industrial Revolution when the town grew due to the cotton industry.  Th listed buildings consist of a house, a farm building, two churches and a cotton mill.


Key

Buildings

References

Citations

Sources

Lists of listed buildings in Greater Manchester
Buildings and structures in the Metropolitan Borough of Oldham